Eduard Stayson (13 April 1923 – 22 July 1992) was a Soviet sailor. He competed in the Dragon event at the 1960 Summer Olympics.

References

External links
 

1923 births
1992 deaths
Soviet male sailors (sport)
Olympic sailors of the Soviet Union
Sailors at the 1960 Summer Olympics – Dragon
Sportspeople from Saint Petersburg